The Southeast Asian Swimming Championships are a biennial aquatics championships for countries from Southeast Asia organised by South East Asian Swimming Federation (SEASF). These championships include competition in Swimming, Diving, Synchronized Swimming (synchro), and Water Polo. The first edition of these championships were the aquatics competitions at the 2012 Southeast Asian Swimming Championships held in June 2012 in Singapore. Championships among masters began 2019.

SEA Seniors Championships 
SEA Seniors Championships:

SEA Masters Championships 
SEA Masters Championships:

SEA Age Groups Championships 

SEA Age Group Championships:    
Ages:

 11 - 13 Boys and Girls
 13 - 15 Boys and Girls
 15 - 17 Boys and Girls

SEA Inter-Club Age Groups Championships 
SEA Inter-Club Age Groups Championships:

Medals 
Medal ranking:

Seniors

2012

2014

Masters

2019

Age Groups

2005

2007

2008

2009

2012

2013

2014

2015

2016

2017

2018

2019

Participating countries

Championships records

See also
Swimming at the South East Asian Games

References

Swimming competitions in Asia
Sport in Southeast Asia